is the fourth film made from the popular anime series Sgt. Frog. The film was released on March 7, 2009 in Japanese theatres. It was produced by Sunrise, the studio behind the anime television series. The film later got released to DVD on July 24, 2009 in Japan.

Plot

Mysterious giant beings called "Ryū no Shippo" (Dragon Tails) appeared across the world. Due to the danger it could bring, the Keroro Platoon did a worldwide research on the Dragon Tails, but Tamama suddenly disappeared during the research. Because of this, the whole platoon started their search for Tamama and ended up in Mont-Saint-Michel, France where they met mysterious girl named Sion, who holds the mysterious Ryū no Hon (Dragon Book). But little they know about the secrets about her and the worldwide calamity that would destroy the entire world, as they know it...

Cast

Reception
During its first week, Keroro Gunso the Super Movie 4: Gekishin Dragon Warriors was placed 5th at the Japanese box office.

See also
 Sgt. Frog
 Keroro Gunsō the Super Movie
 Keroro Gunso the Super Movie 2: The Deep Sea Princess
 Keroro Gunso the Super Movie 3: Keroro vs. Keroro Great Sky Duel

References

External links
 
 

2009 anime films
Animated films set in New York City
Animated films set in Paris
Films set in Sydney
Films set in Tanzania
Animated films set in Tokyo
Sgt. Frog films
Animated films about dragons